The little forktail (Enicurus scouleri) is a species of bird in the family Muscicapidae. The specific name commemorates Dr John Scouler of Glasgow.

Description
The sexes are alike, with black and white plumage. Black above, with white forehead; white band in wings extends across lower back, small, black rump patch; slightly forked, short tail with white in outer feathers; black throat, white below.

Distribution and habitat
The little forktail is a bird of mountain streams, waterfalls and small shaded forest puddles; breeding between 1200-3700m. It is found in the Tian Shan and Himalayan mountain ranges, southern China and Taiwan. Its natural habitats are subtropical or tropical moist lowland forest and subtropical or tropical moist montane forest.

Behaviour
They are either solitary or are found in pairs. They forage energetically on moss-covered and wet slippery rocks. constantly wags and flicks tail, occasionally launches short sallies, but also plunges underwater, dipper- style to pursue prey. Their diet includes aquatic insects.  They are generally silent save for a rarely uttered sharp 'TZitTzit' call.

References

little forktail
Birds of Afghanistan
Birds of China
Birds of the Himalayas
Birds of Central Asia
Birds of Taiwan
little forktail
Taxonomy articles created by Polbot